The Shishugou Formation is a geological formation in Xinjiang, China.

Its strata date back to the Late Jurassic period. Dinosaur remains are among the fossils that have been recovered from the formation. The Shishugou Formation is considered one of the most phylogenetically and trophically diverse Middle to Late Jurassic theropod fauna.

The Wucaiwan Member, once considered a separate, underlying formation, is now considered the lowest unit of the Shishugou Formation.

Lithology 
At the Wuwaican locality, the formation is approximately 380 m thick, the lower 30 metres of the formation predominantly consist of conglomerate, with the majority of the formation consisting of red coloured mudstone with frequent channel/sheet sandstone lenses and occasional tuffaceous deposits. It is laterally equivalent to the Qigu Formation in the southern half of the Junggar Basin.

Shishugou Formation dinosaur traps 
The Shishugou Formation dinosaur traps also known as death pits or death traps are pit structures found within the formation that are noted for their fossil content.

Paleontology 
The pits are filled with a mix of alluvial and volcanic mudstone and sandstone and appear to have been created by the trampling and wallowing of large dinosaurs. Small theropods and vertebrates then became mired in these pits, dying and being forced deeper by the activities of the large dinosaurs and the struggles of later victims. The high quality of preservation suggests a rapid burying of the carcasses. Some scavenging of the bodies took place leading to a dispersal of body parts. Smaller vertebrates were prone to getting stuck in these mudholes, and the small ceratosaur, Limusaurus inextricabilis, is the most common in the resulting bonebeds.

Excavations since 2000 have revealed a wealth of fossils dating from a period some 165 to 155 million years ago. Palaeontologists James Clark and Xu Xing are shedding light on this period previously notorious for its paucity of fossils, but important for its massive burst of speciation among the dinosaurs and ancestors of birds. These new branches on the dinosaur family tree led to well-known dinosaur groups, such as the horned ceratopsians, armoured stegosaurs, and tyrannosaurs. Clark joined Xu, from Beijing's Institute of Vertebrate Paleontology and Paleoanthropology, to explore the Junggar Basin, and in particular the Shishugou Formation, where the exposed rocks have been linked to the Middle Jurassic.

Prehistoric life 

At the time the area was covered by marshland, adjoined a small mountain range peppered with volcanoes, and was inhabited by dinosaurs, small crocodilians and amphibians. Currently it is a sparsely settled region of dry washes, arid badlands and dunes along the Gobi desert’s western edge. The Shishugou Formation consists of mudstone, siltstone, and sandstone, and is named for the silicified wood or petrified logs found here. ('Shishugou' = 'stone tree valley') These badlands were used for some sequences in the film Crouching Tiger, Hidden Dragon, the genus Yinlong ('hidden dragon') being named for the film.

When the site was first excavated, new species of turtles, crocodilians, pterosaurs, and early mammals were revealed. Many of these species showed the rudiments of characteristics that would later become their hallmarks. One of the first fossil skeletons exposed proved to be that of an unknown theropod, and revealed a stack of four more theropods buried below the first. Yang Zhongjian accompanied the first expedition to the Junggar Basin in 1928, and the fossils found included the medium-size sauropod Tienshanosaurus chitaiensis. Later expeditions stretched from the 1960s to the 1990s and yielded among others the extremely long-necked Mamenchisaurus and the carnivorous Sinraptor. In all, some 600 specimens have been collected.

On analysis of the rock matrix, large amounts of volcanic ash were found, hinting at eruptions during that period, the ash raining onto the marsh creating viscous mud and becoming subsequent death traps. To date three of these death pits have been located. In one pit a crocodilian was found against a small ceratosaur, in another three decapitated ceratosaurs. The most interesting of the traps gave up the fossil remains of an 80 kg tyrannosauroid named Guanlong, sporting a crest running from its nose to the back of its head. Its discovery was hailed by paleontologists as the earliest known remains of the tyrannosauroid clan that culminated with Tyrannosaurus rex.

Vertebrate paleofauna

Ornithischians 
Undescribed stegosaur is present in the Wucaiwan member. Undescribed ornithopod is present in the Wucaiwan member. Undescribed ankylosaurs present in both upper Shishugou and Wucaiwan members.

Pterosaurs

Sauropods

Theropods 
Undescribed ornithomimosaur-like species. Indeterminate tetanuran remains.

Crocodylomorphs 
After an overview of crocodylomorphs of the Junggar Basin, Wings et al. identified the following species from the Shishugou Formation.

Mammaliamorphs

See also 
 
 
 List of dinosaur-bearing rock formations

References 

Geologic formations of China
Geologic formations of Mongolia
Jurassic System of Asia
Jurassic China
Jurassic Mongolia
Callovian Stage
Oxfordian Stage
Mudstone formations
Sandstone formations
Tuff formations
Fluvial deposits
Lacustrine deposits
Paludal deposits
Fossiliferous stratigraphic units of Asia
Paleontology in Xinjiang